"Well Enough Alone" is the first single from the Chevelle album Vena Sera and was released to radio the week of February 13, 2007. According to lead singer Pete Loeffler, "Well Enough Alone" was an unreleased song that had been recorded prior to the release of their third album This Type of Thinking (Could Do Us In), before it was refined for Vena Sera.

The song was featured in WWE SmackDown! vs. Raw 2008.

Critical reception
Loudwire ranked it the ninth greatest Chevelle song.

Track listing

Music video 
The music video which is directed by Brian Scott Weber intercuts footage of the band performing with shots of the band jumping in and out of water which was done with the help of special effects.

Personnel 
Pete Loeffler – vocals, guitar
Dean Bernardini – bass
Sam Loeffler – drums
Michael "Elvis" Baskette – producer

Charts

References

External links 
 Video on YouTube

2007 singles
Chevelle (band) songs
Songs written by Pete Loeffler
2007 songs
Epic Records singles
Song recordings produced by Michael Baskette
Songs written by Sam Loeffler